Olivia Overskov Jakobsen (born 29 September 1996) is a Danish professional racing cyclist. She rides for Team Rytger.

See also
 List of 2015 UCI Women's Teams and riders

References

External links
 

1996 births
Living people
Danish female cyclists
Place of birth missing (living people)
20th-century Danish women
21st-century Danish women